Gajpati Ujjainiya (also known as Gajpati Sahi or Gajjan Sahi) (1484-1577) was a chieftain of the Ujjainiya Rajput clan and also a commander in the army of Sher Shah Suri, the ruler of the Sur Empire. He was the first Ujjainiya chief to have a continued battle with Mughals.

Early life

Gajpati was the son of the Ujjainiya chief, Badal Singh and the nephew of Dalpat Sah. Following a war of succession, Gajpati, his mother and his brother, Bairi Sal were banished and Shivram Singh became the chief of the Ujjainiyas. In 1532, his mother requested Sher Shah Suri to help her sons get back their chieftaincy. With the support of Sher Shah Suri, Gajpati defeated and killed Shivram Singh and came into power in 1534.

There are differing views on the original main seat of the Ujjainiya chief. Some sources claim him to be Raja of Uchna, Bihiya and Bhojpur while others as Dawa village in Bihiya.

Battle of Surajgarha
The Ujjainiyas under the leadership of Raja Gajpati helped Sher Shah Suri in the battle of Surajgarha against the Bengal sultanate who at the time were a major regional power. Raja Gajpati handpicked 2000 of his best men and was able to help Sher Shah Suri in achieving victory. General Ibrahim Khan was killed by Raja Gajpati and all the camp equipment, elephants and artillery pieces of the Bengal army fell into the hands of Ujjainiyas. In return for their help, the Ujjainiyas were entitled to any of the spoils of war that they looted from the defeated army. Sher Shah also assigned Buxar to him as a reward and gifted a sword to his brother, Bairi Sal.

Aftermath
Following the battle, Gajpati was embroiled in another familial feud with Birbhan of Arail who requested Emperor Humayun in gaining the throne of Bhojpur in 1538. Humayun provided him with some retainers and they succeeded in driving Gajpati out of his stronghold. Birbhan also supported Humayun in his clashes with Sher Shah Suri as a result of this. Gajpati in turn, after being dispossessed from his estate, joined Sher Shah Suri and possibly took a leading role in the Battle of Chausa. He then managed to recapture his estate and made Jagdishpur his capital and constructed a fortress there. After the defeat of Humayun, Gajpati extended his boundaries till Jaunpur, becoming the most powerful chief of North-west Bihar. 

Later in his life, he eventually did ally with the Mughals in their offensive against Afghans in Bihar but oftentimes kept raising the standard of rebellion.

References

Sur Empire
1484 births
1577 deaths
Rajputs